Repetitive tunings are alternative tunings for the guitar. A repetitive tuning begins with a list of notes that is duplicated, either at unison or at higher octaves.

Among regular tunings, there are four repetitive-tunings (besides trivially repetitive tunings such as C-C-C-C-C-C); this article discusses three minor-thirds tuning, major-thirds tuning, and augmented-fourths tuning (but not major seconds tuning, which is not repetitive on six strings). Among open tunings, there are repetitive versions of open C tuning and open G tuning, which have been associated with the English and Russian guitars, respectively.

Repetition eases the learning of fretboard and chords and eases improvisation. For example, in major-thirds tuning, chords are raised an octave by shifting fingers by three strings on the same frets.

Repetitive tunings are listed after their number of open pitches. For example, the repetitive open-C tuning C-E-G-C-E-G has three open-pitches, each of which is associated with repeated notes {(C,C), (E,E), (G,G)}.

One

The trivial tuning repeats the same note every string. It is also called a unison regular tuning.
C-C-C-C-C-C.

Other trivial-tunings repeat their single notes on a higher octave (or on higher octaves), for example,
C-C-c-c-c'-c'.

Two

The following tunings repeat their notes on a higher octave after two strings:

 Augmented-fourths tuning, for example, B-F-b-f-b'-f'.
Any note fingered on one string can be fingered on two other strings. Thus chords can be fingered in many ways in augmented-fourths tuning. It is also a regular tuning in which  the interval between its strings is a tritone (augmented fourth).

 A cittern tuning, such as C-G-c-g-c'-g'.
There are other tunings for the cittern.

Three

The following tunings repeat their notes after three strings:
 Major-thirds tuning, such as E-G-c-e-g-c' and
 D-G-B-D-G-B-D,
Chord inversion is especially simple in major-thirds tuning. Chords are inverted simply by raising one or two notes three strings. The raised notes are played with the same finger as the original notes. The major-thirds tuning is also a regular tuning having a major third interval between strings.

 Open G tuning, which is used as D', G', B, D, g, b, d' for the (7-string) Russian guitar.
 Open C tuning.  For the English guitar's open C tuning, there are ten strings—of which the highest eight are paired in four courses (duplicated strings), C E GG cc ee gg.

Four

In each minor-thirds tuning, every interval between successive strings is a minor third. It repeats its open-notes after four strings. Doubled notes have different sounds because of  differing "string widths, tensions and
tunings, and [they] reinforce each other,
like the doubled strings of a twelve string guitar
add chorusing and depth," according to William Sethares.

In the minor-thirds tuning beginning with C,
 C-D-F-a-c-d
the open strings contain the notes (c, d, f) of the diminished C chord. The minor-thirds tuning is also a regular tuning, which has a minor third interval between consecutive strings.

See also

 Scordatura, alternative tunings of stringed instruments
 Stringed instrument tunings

Notes

References

 
 

Repetitive guitar-tunings